Diana Song Quiroga is a Magistrate Judge, Laredo Division for the United States District Court for the Southern District of Texas.

Education

Quiroga earned her Bachelor of Arts in Political Economy Summa Cum Laude at the University of California, Berkeley in 1998 and her Juris Doctor at Harvard Law School. She was a law clerk for United States District Judge Keith P. Ellison from 2001 - 2002.

Career

From 2002 - 2004, Quiroga was the Director of Legal Assistance to Micro-enterprises Project, Texas RioGrande Legal Aid (TRLA) and Free Legal Services. In 2005, she worked in the office of the Texas Assistant Attorney General. From 2005 - 2011, she worked in the office of the Assistant United States Attorney, Southern District of Texas, Laredo Division.

On December 20, 2011, Quiroga was appointed United States Magistrate Judge by the United States District Court for the Southern District of Texas. The seat was vacated when then United States Magistrate Judge Diana Saldaña was appointed to a district court judgeship. Quiroga's appointment became effective January 4, 2012.

Notable cases

In 2017, Jose Francisco Morales Jr. pleaded guilty before Judge Quiroga for his role in a conspiracy to smuggle illegal aliens. Morales Jr. was the last of 13 people to be convicted in the conspiracy in which illegal aliens were smuggled past Border Patrol checkpoints between September 2015 and June 2017.  

In 2020, a grand jury indicted Juan Alfredo Crisencio Martinez and Jaythan Trevonne Phillips, who appeared before Judge Quiroga. They were charged for their role in forcibly assaulting a federal officer on February 8, 2020 after they applied for admission into the United States at the Juárez–Lincoln International Bridge in Laredo. A Customs and Border Protection (CBP) officer allegedly began to conduct an immigration inspection and asked them to exit the vehicle but the men refused.  

In 2022, Quiroga was the judge in the case against Alfonso Gonzalez. Gonzalez was a then, 45-year-old (CBP) supervisor who was charged with stealing approximately $6,497.52 from the U.S. government.

References

University of California, Berkeley alumni
Harvard Law School alumni
United States magistrate judges
United States district court judges appointed by Barack Obama
21st-century American women judges
21st-century American judges
Judges of the United States District Court for the Southern District of Texas
Year of birth missing (living people)
Living people